Lauri Aukusti Letonmäki (22 December 1886, in Tampere – 20 November 1935) was a Finnish journalist, teacher, and politician. He was a member of the Parliament of Finland from 1914 to 1916. In 1918, during the Finnish Civil War, Letonmäki was Commissioner for Justice in the Finnish People's Delegation, the government of the Finnish Socialist Workers' Republic. After the Red side lost the war, Letonmäki fled to Soviet Russia, where he was among the founders of the Communist Party of Finland (SKP). He committed suicide in 1935.

References

1886 births
1935 suicides
Politicians from Tampere
People from Häme Province (Grand Duchy of Finland)
Social Democratic Party of Finland politicians
Communist Party of Finland politicians
Members of the Parliament of Finland (1913–16)
Finnish People's Delegation members
Finnish emigrants to the Soviet Union
Finnish politicians who committed suicide
Suicides in the Soviet Union
1935 deaths